Kanlidzha may refer to:
 Marmashen, Armenia, formerly Verin Kanlidzha
 Vagramaberd, Armenia, formerly, Nerkin Kanlidzha